Grgur Radoš (born 31 January 1988 in Munich) is a Croatian football player who plays for German amateur side SV Laim.

Personal life
His twin brother Mislav Radoš is a professional footballer as well and holds German citizenship and is a cousin of Danijel Pranjic.

References

External links
 Kicker Profile

1988 births
Living people
Footballers from Munich
Association football forwards
Croatian footballers
U.S. Triestina Calcio 1918 players
NK Varaždin players
FSV Oggersheim players
Hamburger SV II players
Croatian Football League players
Regionalliga players